Bay Bridge may refer to:

 Aomori Bay Bridge, Aomori Prefecture, Japan
 Chesapeake Bay Bridge, Maryland, United States
 Chesapeake Bay Bridge–Tunnel, Virginia, United States
 CRRNJ Newark Bay Bridge (demolished), Elizabeth-Bayonne, New Jersey, United States
 Irondequoit Bay Bridge, New York, United States
 Jiaozhou Bay Bridge, Shandong, China
 Newark Bay Bridge, Newark, New Jersey, United States
 San Francisco–Oakland Bay Bridge, California, United States
 Upper Bay Bridge, Newark-Bayonne, New Jersey, United States
 Yokohama Bay Bridge, Yokohama, Japan

See also
 Baybridge (disambiguation)